The inferior laryngeal vein is a vein which drains the larynx. It runs parallel to the laryngeal arteries.

References 

Veins of the head and neck